Tavaziva Madzinga (born c.1978) is a Zimbabwean actuary and corporate executive, who was appointed as the Group Managing Director of Britam Holdings Plc (Britam), a financial services conglomerate headquartered in Nairobi, the Kenyan capital, with subsidiaries in Kenya, Uganda, South Sudan, Rwanda, Tanzania, Malawi and Mozambique. His appointment became effective on 1 February 2021.

In November 2021, the Business Daily Africa newspaper reported that Madzinga would leave Britam in April 2022, to pursue other interests. In December 2021, it was revealed that Madzinga would become an executive director at Santam, a financial services and insurance provider in Eastern and Southern Africa, effective 1 April 2022. On 1 July 2022, he will become the Group chief executive officer at Santam, replacing Lizé Lambrechts, who will leave the group. She will stay on the job, between 1 April 2022 and 30 June 2022, "to ensure a smooth transition". Madzinga will be based in Bellville, City of Cape Town, South Africa.

Background and education
Madzinga was born in Zimbabwe in the 1970s. He studied at the University of Cape Town, graduating with a Bachelor of Business Science in Actuarial Science. He also holds further professional qualifications from INSEAD and Harvard Business School. He is a Fellow of the Institute of Actuaries of the United Kingdom and a Fellow of the Actuarial Society of South Africa.

Career
As of January 2021, his career stretched back in excess of 20 years in the insurance business. He started out at Old Mutual, rising over the years to Regional Chief Executive Officer, for Eastern and Southern Africa. Over the 16 years he spent at Old Mutual, he served for a period of time as CEO of Old Mutual Kenya and as CEO of the Old Mutual subsidiary in Nigeria.

He then transferred to Swiss Reinsurance Company Limited, first as Managing Director, of the Middle East and Africa division and then as Chief Executive Officer of the United Kingdom and Ireland business unit, from January 2019 until January 2021. He spent three years at Swiss Re.

At Britam Holdings, Madzinga replaced Benson Irungu Wairegi, who has served at the regional conglomerate for the previous 40 years. He will be based in Nairobi, Kenya's capital city.

Other considerations
Tavaziva Madzinga served on the board of the Association of British Insurers, in his capacity as the CEO of Swiss Re.

See also
Equity Group Holdings Limited
Housing Finance Company of Kenya

References

External links
 Zimbabwean Tavaziva Madzinga to replace Wairegi as Britam CEO As of 18 January 2021.

Living people
1978 births
Zimbabwean businesspeople
Zimbabwean business executives
Zimbabwean chief executives
University of Cape Town alumni
Harvard Business School alumni
INSEAD alumni
Zimbabwean expatriates in Kenya
Zimbabwean actuaries